Allocapnia fumosa is a stonefly in the family Capniidae.  It is commonly known as the Smokies snowfly and is found in the Eastern United States, including North Carolina, Tennessee, and Virginia.  It is found in the Great Smoky Mountains, and its species name is Latin for "smoky."

It is a small, winged insect found at fast, rocky streams at high elevations. It was first described by Ross in 1964.

References

Plecoptera
Insects described in 1964